This list of flags of regions of Egypt shows the flags of the 27 governorates of Egypt.

Historical

See also
Flag of Egypt
List of Egyptian flags

External links

Egypt geography-related lists
Flags of Egypt
Egypt
Egypt